Les Bancals is a 1983 French film directed by Hervé Lièvre. It stars Paul Crauchet, Albert Delpy, Gilbert Bahon, and Mathieu Barbey. It was released on 18 May 1983.

References

External links

French drama films
1983 films
1980s French films